Lopadorrhynchidae is a family of polychaete worms.

References

External links 

 
 Lopadorrhynchidae at the World Register of Marine Species (WoRMS)

Phyllodocida
Annelid families